Antelope Valley Transit Authority is the transit agency serving the cities of Palmdale, Lancaster and Northern Los Angeles County. Antelope Valley Transit Authority is operated under contract by MV Transportation, and is affiliated with and offers connecting services with Metro and Metrolink.

Services 
As of 2020, AVTA operates a fleet of 88 buses, 58 buses dedicated to local service and 30 to commuter service. AVTA runs:
15 local bus routes
-Route 1: Lancaster Station/South Valley Transit Center

-Route 2: Antelope Valley Mall/South Valley Transit Center

-Route 3: Antelope Valley Mall/South Valley Transit Center

-Route 4: Lancaster Station /Owen Memorial Park

-Route 5: Quartz Hill/Owen Memorial Park

-Route 7: Lancaster Station/Palmdale Transportation Center

-Route 8: Antelope Valley College/Palmdale Boulevard

-Route 9: Quartz Hill/Owen Memorial Park

-Route 11: Owen Memorial Park/Avenue J

-Route 12: Owen Memorial Park/Avenue J

-Route 50: Owen Memorial Park & Lake Los Angeles

-Route 51: Palmdale Transportation Cent. & Lake Los Angeles

-Route 52: South Valley Transit Center & Pearblossom, CA

3 Supplemental routes to high schools and community colleges.
Commuter service to Downtown and the Westside of Los Angeles and to the western San Fernando Valley
"North County Transporter", operating between morning and evening commuting hours when there is no Metrolink train service at the Palmdale and Lancaster Metrolink stations. Transporter provides a bus connection with the Newhall Metrolink station in Santa Clarita, where there is all-day train service to and from Los Angeles Union Station.

History 
The cities of Palmdale and Lancaster and the Los Angeles County Department of Public Works jointly created the Antelope Valley Transit Authority in 1992 to meet the growing need for public transportation in the Antelope Valley.  AVTA began local transit service on July 1, 1992, with three types of services:  Transit, Commuter and Dial-A-Ride.  A fourth service, Access Services, was created in 1996 to provide the disabled with a local complementary paratransit service in line with the Americans with Disabilities Act.
AVTA opened a larger facility in 2004 to accommodate increased demand.

On March 17, 2017, AVTA drivers struck.  The dispute was between the driver's union Teamsters Local 848 and the system operator Transdev.  After making their statement, the drivers elected to return to service by March 19 while negotiations between the parties continued.  However the drivers went on strike again, May 3 was the third walkout which lasted at least a week.  As the dispute continued, drivers were locked out on August 22.

In 2017, AVTA became the first transit agency in the United States to operate a 60-foot, articulated electric bus, manufactured by BYD in Lancaster.

In 2018, the Antelope Valley Transit Authority began to charge its electric buses on special wireless charging pads located along bus routes.

In January 2019, AVTA began commuter service to Edwards Air Force Base. Later that year, AVTA celebrated two significant milestones in its conversion to an all-electric fleet, achieving both a one million (May), then two million (December), zero emission miles driven.  The service has been suspended since the start of the pandemic.

In May of 2022, AVTA drivers struck. The dispute was about unfair labor practices with Teamsters Union 848 and Transdev. The contract expired and  MV Transportation took over operations as of June 2022.

Discounts 
Senior citizens, people with disabilities, active military, and veterans may ride AVTA local buses free of charge with proper ID. Up to 4 children up to 44 inches tall may ride with an adult free of charge.

Awards 
The Los Angeles County Board of Supervisors recognized AVTA as an “Efficient Transit System”.  The California Transit Association gave a “Transit Innovation Award” to AVTA in 1998 and a “Transit Image Award” in 1999.

Commuter services 
Commuter Services provides service to and from major places of employment outside of the Antelope Valley (Routes 785-787). Commuter Services service is only operated Monday – Friday.

Route 785 travels from Lancaster & Palmdale to Downtown Los Angeles.

Route 786 travels from Lancaster & Palmdale to Westwood & University of California, Los Angeles (UCLA).

Route 787 travels from Lancaster & Palmdale to the San Fernando Valley & Warner Center.

Commuter Service between Santa Clarita and Palmdale serve as the Transporter, service operates between Mcbean Regional Transit Center and Palmdale. The official route number is 790, this route operates Monday - Friday. However, as of December 2022 the route only operates  between Palmdale and Newhall station.

References

External links 
 

Public transportation in Los Angeles County, California
Bus transportation in California
Transportation in Palmdale, California
Transportation in Lancaster, California
Mojave Desert
Transit agencies in California
Transdev
Veolia
1992 establishments in California